Werther is a German surname. Notable people with the surname include:

Adolf Werthner (1828–1906), German publisher
Georg Werthner (born 1956), Austrian decathlete
Penny Werthner (born 1951), Canadian track and field athlete

German-language surnames